The Bantamweight boxing competition at the 2014 Commonwealth Games in Glasgow, Scotland took place between 25 July and 2 August at the Scottish Exhibition and Conference Centre. Bantamweights were limited to those boxers weighing above 52 kilograms to 56 kilograms.

Like all Commonwealth boxing events, the competition was a straight single-elimination tournament. Both semifinal losers were awarded bronze medals, so no boxers competed again after their first loss. Bouts consisted of three rounds of three minutes each, with one-minute breaks between rounds. Punches scored only if the front of the glove made full contact with the front of the head or torso of the opponent. Tree scored each bout; The winner of the bout was the boxer who won the most rounds.

Schedule
All times are British Summer Time (UTC+1)

Medalists

Results

References

Boxing at the 2014 Commonwealth Games